Kulseh-ye Olya (also Romanized as Kūlseh-ye ‘Olyā; also known as Kūlseh-ye Bālā) is a village in Bask-e Kuleseh Rural District, in the Central District of Sardasht County, West Azerbaijan Province, Iran. At the 2006 census, its population was 500, in 86 families.

References 

Populated places in Sardasht County